HMS Hampton Court was a 70-gun third-rate ship of the line of the Royal Navy, built at Rotherhithe according to the 1706 Establishment and launched on 19 August 1709.

Hampton Court was part of Vice-Admiral Edward Vernon's fleet and took part in the expedition to Cartagena de Indias during the War of Jenkins' Ear.

On 12 December 1741 orders were issued for Hampton Court to be taken to pieces and rebuilt by Joseph Allin the younger at Deptford Dockyard as a 64-gun third rate to the 1741 proposals of the 1719 Establishment. She was relaunched on 3 April 1744.

In November 1745 she encountered her fellow Royal Navy vessel . The crew of both vessels mistook the other for a French man-o-war and opened fire at long range. The engagement ended after half an hour, when crew aboard Defiance observed British markings on the cannonballs striking their ship and signaled for a truce.

Hampton Court remained in service until 1774, when she was broken up.

Notes

References

 Lavery, Brian (2003) The Ship of the Line – Volume 1: The development of the battlefleet 1650–1850. Conway Maritime Press. .

External links
 

Ships of the line of the Royal Navy
1700s ships
Ships built in Deptford
Ships built in Rotherhithe